Route 301 is a collector road in the Canadian province of Nova Scotia.

It is located in Cumberland County and connects Oxford at Route 204 with Port Howe at Trunk 6.

From Port Howe it follows the western bank of River Philip to Oxford town limits. In Oxford it continues in a south-west direction to its terminus at Little River Road Route 204 as Lower Main Street.

Communities
Oxford(Lower Main Street)
Kolbec (Kolbec Road)
Riverview
Port Howe (Kolbec Road)

See also
List of Nova Scotia provincial highways

References

Nova Scotia provincial highways
Roads in Cumberland County, Nova Scotia